Chelle is a surname. Notable people with the surname include:

 Éric Chelle (born 1977), Malian footballer
 Ludovic Chelle (born 1983), Malian-French basketball player
 Nelson Chelle (1931–2001), Uruguayan basketball player
 Oscar Chelle (born 1922), Uruguayan footballer